, also known as The Maid Dragon of Kobayashi-san is a Japanese manga series written and illustrated by Coolkyousinnjya. The series began serialization in Futabasha's Monthly Action magazine since May 2013 and is licensed in North America by Seven Seas Entertainment. Four spin-off manga have also been serialized in Monthly Action. 

An anime television series adaptation produced by Kyoto Animation aired in Japan between January and April 2017. A second season titled Miss Kobayashi's Dragon Maid S aired between July and September 2021. A video game titled Miss Kobayashi's Dragon Maid: Burst Forth!! Choro-gon Breath was released in Japan in March 2022 and was released in North America by Aksys Games in August 2022.

Plot
As office worker and programmer Kobayashi gets ready for work, she is greeted by a large dragon right outside her front door. The dragon immediately transforms into a humanoid girl in a maid outfit and introduces herself as Tohru. It turns out, that during a drunken excursion into the mountains the night before, Kobayashi had encountered the dragon, who claimed to have come from another world. Subsequently, Kobayashi removed a holy sword from Tohru's back, earning her gratitude. With Tohru having no place to stay, Kobayashi offers to let the dragon stay at her home and become her personal maid, to which she agrees, having fallen in love with Kobayashi.

Despite being efficient at housework, Tohru proves an unorthodox character, occasionally scaring Kobayashi and often bringing more trouble to Kobayashi's life than help. Additionally, Tohru's presence alone attracts other dragons, gods, and mythical beings to her new home. One of these dragons, Kanna, shows up at Kobayashi's door, demanding that Kobayashi return Tohru to the other world. It is then revealed that she'd been exiled from the other world, and having nowhere else to stay, Kobayashi takes her in and becomes her guardian. As both Tohru and Kanna settle into the human world, Kobayashi starts to think of them as family.

Characters

Main

A 25-year-old normal programmer and office worker who suddenly finds herself living with a dragon named Tohru after removing a divine sword from it on a drunken night. While typically stoic and kind-hearted, she can get wild when drunk. She will usually get hangovers resulting in the cast having to wait on her hand and foot. She has a particular fascination with maids. She is occasionally mistaken as a boy due to her lack of feminine features—particularly her flat chest—and apparent lack of sexuality. Her first name is unknown.

A female dragon of the Chaos faction who comes from another world called the dragon realm and is capable of using magic to perform such tasks as "perception-blocking" (which causes people to simply overlook her), repairing damage she may have caused, or transforming between a dragon and a human. After her life is saved by Kobayashi, she falls in love with her and starts living in her flat as a maid. She usually retains her horns when changing into human shape, and occasionally retains her tail and wings. She is commonly mistaken for a cosplayer due to her appearance. A running gag involves her attempting to feed Kobayashi pieces of her tail (which she can regenerate) with her cooking as a sign of affection and a sign of love. In chapter 97 of the manga Kobayashi finally confesses her feelings to Tohru.

Tohru's friend from the dragon realm who was exiled from her world for pulling one too many pranks on other dragons and wound up living with Kobayashi as well; she initially assumes that Kobayashi seduced Tohru into staying and wanted the latter to return to their original world, but then grows increasingly attached to Kobayashi as the series progresses, viewing her as a mother figure. Though Kanna has yet to align with a dragon faction, Kanna is highly regarded due to bearing the name "Kamui"; her basis and attire are inspired by the culture of the indigenous natives of Hokkaido, and she herself claims to be from Ushishir. She bears feather-like horns and a thin tail ending in a bulb, and is capable of recharging her depleted magical energy with electricity. She is the crush of Riko Saikawa, which she reciprocates whereupon the two state they want to marry each other.

Dragons

A water dragon belonging to the Order faction, rival to Tohru's Chaos faction, who ends up working alongside Kobayashi at her office after getting stuck in the human world. She is as powerful as she is diligent and driven, but also naive, indecisive, and with a ravenous appetite; she will often go broke (in part due to her low income) and is easily swayed by food, primarily if it is sweet. Her human form is distinguished by purple hair, a horn (which she hides for work), her habit of having a jacket or kimono hanging off her shoulder, and wielding a trident;   is the identity she uses while in Kobayashi's workplace. Several chapters of the manga focus on her having had an old friendship with Tohru which was broken due to their alignments, with chapter 96 revealing that she has feelings for Tohru that she confesses to Tohru, despite being expectedly spurned.
 

A female adaptation of her namesake, —often referred to as Lucoa (from "Quetzalcoatl" as adapted to the Japanese syllabary)—is another friend of Tohru who is aligned with neither faction, having lost her divine status centuries ago after getting drunk and causing a scandal involving her younger sister; Tohru will sometimes casually reference this much to Lucoa's embarrassment. Lucoa appears in her human form as a tall, well-endowed woman with striking heterochromia. Tohru sees her as a source of wisdom, but Lucoa's discomfort with clothes—which she tolerates should she be required to be dressed—often leaves her preferring to wear tight-fitting clothing that shows a lot of skin; a running gag involves others criticizing her for this, marking her as a pervert, or—should they be a staff member of a public place—dragging her away should her attire be inappropriate. Most notably, she lives with Shouta after she interrupted his demon-summoning spell to prevent him from summoning a dangerous demon, causing him to mistakenly believe she is a succubus; and in her attempts to warm him up to her, she often becomes overly affectionate with Shouta, scaring him.
 

Another adaptation of his namesake and old friend of Tohru. He is a male Chaos faction dragon with a cold demeanour, disdainful mentality, and strong distrust for humans. He appears as a refined young man with long black hair and red eyes in his human form. After he decides to stay on earth, Tohru attempts to find him a place to do so (under the name ); Fafnir eventually comes to live with Takiya, becoming obsessed with video games and popular culture.

A Chaos faction dragon who targets Tohru because of her relationship with a human, attempting to destroy the city in the process. She then turns her eye to Kobayashi, trying to drive her and Tohru apart to prove her beliefs; but after Kobayashi and Tohru save her from an Order dragon, she has a change of heart and ends up living with them. Ilulu appears in her human form as a petite girl with a very ample bust. Her mental growth was somewhat impaired due to various beliefs that were forced on her by other chaos dragons. When she was younger, she enjoyed playing with human children; and since coming to Earth, she has taken up a job at a candy store, so that she can still see children when they are happy. 

Tohru's father, who disapproves of Tohru's relationship with Kobayashi due to their beliefs as Chaos dragons and because of a non-interference rule about Earth. He attempts to force Tohru to leave with him but decides to let her stay after Kobayashi stands up to him, despite knowing how easily he could kill her. He still leaves Kobayashi alive, as he does not want to risk angering Tohru, who he recognizes as stronger than him.

Humans

Kobayashi's co-worker who is initially believed by Tohru to be a rival for Kobayashi's affections, but is really just an otaku who thinks of Kobayashi as "one of the guys" and likes to talk about maids with her. Kobayashi helps him set up during Comiket every year. Fafnir eventually decides to live with him in the human world due to his enormous game and manga collection.

Kanna's primary school classmate who can be haughty towards her other classmates. Should someone strike her as cute, she will be overwhelmed with affection towards that person; she is thus initially hostile towards Kanna but soon develops a crush on her, with a running gag involving her being flushed with bliss for most of her time around Kanna. Kanna reciprocates her feelings, and the two state they want to marry each other.
 / 

Riko's older sister who pretends to be a housemaid as her hobby and thus gets on very well with Kobayashi. She so deeply identifies as "Georgie" that she seems to have forgotten that her real name, which was later revealed as "Sanae".

A young mage who Lucoa starts living with after she interrupted his demon-summoning spell. He is thus convinced that Lucoa is a succubus, and though she tries to clear the misunderstanding, her overly familiar antics do little to help her case. A running gag involves him blushing and running away every time he gets caught up in such antics and scolding her as a "demon". In the anime, he is in fifth grade at the school Riko and Kanna attend. His father is the director of Kobayashi's company, who designed their programming language based on magic from the other world, and keeps tabs on Tohru and Kobayashi for the Emperor of Demise.

Taketo is a highschooler and grandson of the owner of the candy shop where Ilulu works. Embarrassed at first with her lack of common sense and voluptuous body, Taketo eventually grows close with Ilulu, who starts having romantic feelings for him.

Media

Manga

Coolkyousinnjya began publishing the series in the first issue of Futabasha's Monthly Action magazine on 25 May 2013. Seven Seas Entertainment licensed the series in North America, and they released the first volume in October 2016. 

A spin-off manga illustrated by Mitsuhiro Kimura, titled , began serialization in Monthly Action on 24 December 2016. Seven Seas Entertainment also licensed the spin-off in North America. 

A second spin-off drawn by Ayami Kazama, titled , began serialization in Monthly Action on 25 August 2017. The second spin-off is also licensed by Seven Seas. 

A third manga spin-off drawn by Utamaro began serialization in Monthly Action on 25 January 2019. 

A fourth spin-off series drawn by Nobuyoshi Zamurai began serialization in Monthly Action on 25 November 2020. The fourth spin-off is also licensed by Seven Seas.

Anime

On 18 April 2016, the wraparound cover of the fourth volume of the series revealed that an anime television series adaptation had been greenlit. The series was directed by Yasuhiro Takemoto at Kyoto Animation and aired in Japan between 12 January and 6 April 2017. Yuka Yamada handled series composition, Miku Kadowaki designed the characters, Nobuaki Maruki served as chief animation director, and the music was composed by Masumi Itō. Crunchyroll simulcast the series outside of Asia as it aired while Funimation released an English dubbed version from 1 February 2017. Plus Media Networks Asia licensed the first season in Southeast Asia and simulcasted it on Aniplus Asia. An original video animation episode was released on the seventh Blu-ray/DVD compilation volume on 20 September 2017. Madman Entertainment will import Funimation's release into Australia and New Zealand.

A second season was announced with the release of the eighth manga volume on 12 February 2019. Its status was unknown for a time following the death of Takemoto in the Kyoto Animation arson attack. Titled , the season aired between 8 July and 23 September 2021. Kyoto Animation returned to produce the season. Tatsuya Ishihara replaced Takemoto as director, although Takemoto is credited as "series director" under Ishihara. Yuka Yamada returned to supervise the series' scripts, Masumi Itō returned as music composer, and Miku Kadowaki and Nobuaki Maruki returned as character designer and chief animation director, respectively. The cast members also returned to reprise their roles. An original video animation was released with the special "Volume S" Blu-ray/DVD volume on 19 January 2022. In the season finale, "Aozora no Rhapsody" plays as an ending theme, with the song also making a short appearance in episode 3. Bilibili licensed the second season in Southeast Asia.

Video game
On 23 September 2021, Bushiroad announced that Kaminari Games is developing a shoot 'em up video game based on the series. Titled Miss Kobayashi's Dragon Maid: Burst Forth!! Choro-gon Breath, it was released on 24 March 2022 on Nintendo Switch and PlayStation 4 in Japan, which was followed by a worldwide launch on the same consoles on 25 August 2022.

See also
I Can't Understand What My Husband Is Saying, a series by the same author
Komori-san Can't Decline, another series by the same author

Notes

References

External links
 at Monthly Action 
 
 at Seven Seas Entertainment

2017 anime television series debuts
2021 anime television series debuts
2010s LGBT-related comedy television series
2022 video games
Anime series based on manga
Comedy anime and manga
Crunchyroll anime
Crunchyroll Anime Awards winners
Dragons in popular culture
Fantasy anime and manga
Funimation
Futabasha manga
Japanese LGBT-related animated television series
Kyoto Animation
LGBT speculative fiction television series
Seinen manga
Seven Seas Entertainment titles
Slice of life anime and manga
Television censorship in China
Yuri (genre) anime and manga
2020s LGBT-related comedy television series